This is a list of Science and Technology Ministers of Bihar, India.

See also
Department of Science and Technology, Bihar
Government of Bihar
Seventh Nitish Kumar ministry

References

Science and Technology Ministers
Lists of government ministers of Bihar